System testing is testing conducted on a complete integrated system to evaluate the system's compliance with its specified requirements.

System testing takes, as its input, all of the integrated components that have passed integration testing. The purpose of integration testing is to detect any inconsistencies between the units that are integrated together (called assemblages). System testing seeks to detect defects both within the "inter-assemblages" and also within the system as a whole. The actual result is the behavior produced or observed when a component or system is tested.

System testing is performed on the entire system in the context of either functional requirement specifications (FRS) or system requirement specification (SRS), or both. System testing tests not only the design, but also the behaviour and even the believed expectations of the customer. It is also intended to test up to and beyond the bounds defined in the software or hardware requirements specification(s).

Approaches
 Destructive testing: tests are carried out to the specimen's failure, in order to understand a specimen's performance or material behaviour under different loads.
 Nondestructive testing: analysis techniques to evaluate the properties of a material, component or system without causing damage.
Fault injection: A testing technique which stress the system in an unusual way to examine the system behavior.

Subject-specific test methods

Software testing
Software testing is an investigation conducted to provide stakeholders with information about the quality of the software product or service under test. Software testing can also provide an objective, independent view of the software to allow the business to appreciate and understand the risks of software implementation. Software testing involves the execution of a software component or system component to evaluate one or more properties of interest. In general, these properties indicate the extent to which the component or system under test meets the requirements that guided its design and development, responds correctly to all kinds of inputs, performs its functions within an acceptable time, is sufficiently usable, can be installed and run in its intended environments, and achieves the general result its stakeholders desire. As the number of possible tests for even simple software components is practically infinite, all software testing uses some strategy to select tests that are feasible for the available time and resources.

Mobile-device testing
Mobile-device testing assures the quality of mobile devices, like mobile phones, PDAs, etc. The testing will be conducted on both hardware and software. And from the view of different procedures, the testing comprises R&D testing, factory testing and certificate testing. Mobile-device testing involves a set of activities from monitoring and trouble shooting mobile application, content and services on real handsets. Testing includes verification and validation of hardware devices and software applications.

See also
Automatic test equipment
Test case
Test fixture
Test plan
Automated testing
Quality control
Fault injection

Notes

References
 

Software testing
Hardware testing
Systems engineering

de:Softwaretest#Systemtest